Pigs in Heaven is a 1993 novel by Barbara Kingsolver; it is the sequel to her first novel, The Bean Trees.  It continues the story of Taylor Greer and Turtle, her adopted Cherokee daughter. It highlights the strong relationships between mothers and daughters, with special attention given to the customs, history, and present living situation of the Cherokee Nation in Oklahoma. It is Kingsolver's first book to appear on the New York Times Best Seller list.

The New York Times Book Review praised Kingsolver's "extravagantly gifted narrative voice" and called the novel a "resounding achievement".

References

Novels by Barbara Kingsolver
1994 American novels
Sequel novels
Novels set in Oklahoma
HarperCollins books
Cherokee in popular culture
Books about Native Americans